Cross Junction is an unincorporated community in northern Frederick County, Virginia, United States. Cross Junction is located on the North Frederick Pike (U.S. Highway 522) at its intersection with Collinsville Road. Cross Junction also encompasses the residential communities at Lake Holiday to the south.

History and terrain
Cross Junction and its environs consist of rain-fed streams and springs. It is the traditional home of the indigenous Shawnee, who had a settlement and court at Shawnee Springs.  A few old farms in the area are owned mostly descendants of the founders of the European-American community, which dated from the 18th century.  Some date back to the days when George Washington first visited the land and surveyed it.

References

Unincorporated communities in Frederick County, Virginia
Unincorporated communities in Virginia